Steven Cutts is an American actor, writer, and director best known for the role of Shaun in the musical film, Camp, which also starred actress Anna Kendrick.

He appeared in the National Touring, Original Canadian, and Broadway productions of Hairspray. He was described as a "total charmer -- especially in "Run and Tell That" for his performance as Seaweed at the Boston Opera House in 2005. In April 2015, he performed with actor Tituss Burgess at Broadway Cares/Equity Fights AIDS fundraising concert Broadway Backwards, to a standing ovation. Cutts also appeared in the short film, Mother of the Week, which was an official selection of The 2015 Northeast, Orlando, and Big Apple International Film Festivals.

In October 2015, production began on his play Subletters, which starred actress Courtney Reed. In July 2016, Cutts released eBook My Big Fat Broadway Debut: Volume 1 which appeared on Amazon's Hot New Releases list in Theatre Acting and Auditioning. In 2019 he released My Big Fat Broadway Debut! – The Full Story in paperback.

Cutts directed the world premiere stage production of HAZING U: A Modern Greek Tragedy. The show played the Off-Off Broadway house, Hudson Guild Theatre, as part of the 2020 New York Theatre Festival.

References

External links 

 

American male actors
Year of birth missing (living people)
Living people